2023 in arthropod palentology is a list of new arthropod fossil taxa, including arachnids, crustaceans, trilobites, and other arthropods (except insects, which have their own list) that were announced or described, as well as other significant arthropod paleontological discoveries and events which occurred in 2023.

Chelicerates

Arachnids

Arachnid research

Eurypterids

Eurypterid research

Xiphosurans

Xiphosuran research
 Klompmaker et al. (2023) describe a specimen of Limulitella bronnii from the Anisian Muschelkalk sediments of the Vossenveld Formation (Netherlands), extending known temporal range of this species, and provide the diagnosis of L. bronnii for the first time.

Other chelicerates

General chelicerate research

Crustaceans

Malacostracans

Malacostracan research
 Chény, Charbonnier & Audo (2023) reexamine the fossil record of lobsters from the Middle Jurassic of Normandy (France), providing evidence of the presence of sexual dimorphism in Glyphea dressieri and proposing the first reconstruction of this lobster.

Ostracods

Ostracod research

Thecostracans

Thecostracan research

Other crustaceans

General crustacean research

Insects

Megacheirians

Megacheirian research

Radiodonts

Radiodont research

Trilobites

Trilobite research
 A study on the timing of the appearance of trilobite planktic larvae is published Laibl, Saleh & Pérez-Peris (2023), who interpret their findings as indicating that Cambrian ecosystems were dominated by trilobites with exclusively benthic early post-embryonic stages, and that a progressive increase in the number of trilobite taxa that incorporated planktic stages in their development happened between the Miaolingian and the Middle Ordovician.
 Hou, Hughes & Hopkins (2023) report the presence of setae on the walking legs of the Cambrian Olenoides serratus and on the gill shaft of the Ordovician Triarthrus eatoni, and interpret these setae as likely used to groom the gills of the trilobites.
 Gishlick & Fortey (2023) describe a specimen of Walliserops trifurcatus with a malformed cephalic trident showing four rather than three tines, and consider its anatomy to be consistent with the interpretation of the trident as a weapon used for intraspecific combat.

Other arthropods

 New information on the anatomy of Concavicaris woodfordi, including the structure of the shield, the circulatory, digestive and reproductive systems, and the appendages, is presented by Laville et al. (2023).
 New information on the morphology of the Carboniferous millipedes Amynilyspes fatimae and Blanziulus parriati from the Montceau-les-Mines Lagerstätte (France) is presented by Lheritier et al. (2023).

General research

References 

2023 in paleontology